The Mackenzie River wolf or Mackenzie Arctic Wolf (Canis lupus mackenzii) is a subspecies of gray wolf which is found in Canada's southern portion of Northwest Territories. Not much has been published on Canis lupus mackenzii but one of the most comprehensive studies was done in 1954 by W.A. Fuller, Wolf Control Operations, Southern Mackenzie District, Canada Wildlife Service Report. This wolf is recognized as a subspecies of Canis lupus in the taxonomic authority Mammal Species of the World (2005).

This wolf subspecies can be found in Thaidene Nëné National Park Reserve.

References

Mammals of Canada
Subspecies of Canis lupus
Mammals described in 1943

fr:Canis lupus mackenzii